The 2017 BWF season was the overall badminton circuit organized by the Badminton World Federation (BWF) for the 2017 badminton season to publish and promote the sport. Besides the BWF World Championships, BWF promoted the sport of badminton through an extensive worldwide program of events. These events had various purposes according to their level and territory in which they were held but those events owned by BWF seek to showcase the sport via the widest possible quality television broadcast and build the fanbase of the sport throughout the world.

The world badminton tournament structure had four levels: Level 1 (BWF Major Events), Level 2 (BWF Superseries: Superseries and Superseries Premier), Level 3 (BWF Grand Prix: Grand Prix and Grand Prix Gold Series), and Level 4 (BWF International Challenge, BWF International Series, and BWF Future Series). The Thomas Cup & Uber Cup, Sudirman Cup and Suhandinata Cup were Teams Events. The others – Superseries, Grand Prix Events, International Challenge, International Series, and Future Series were all individual tournaments. The higher the level of tournament, the larger the prize money and the more ranking points available.

The 2017 BWF season calendar comprised these four levels of BWF tournaments.

Schedule
This is the complete schedule of events on the 2017 calendar, with the Champions and Runners-up documented.
Key

January

February

March

April

May

June

July

August

September

October

November

December

See also
BWF World Ranking

References

External links
 Badminton World Federation (BWF) at www.bwfbadminton.org

2017 in badminton
Badminton World Federation seasons